Remsen is a city in Plymouth County, Iowa, United States. The population was 1,678 at the time of the 2020 census.

History

Remsen was named for Dr. William Remsen Smith. Smith had a good friend who suggested the name Smithville, but Smith thought that there were too many Smiths in the world, and instead chose to give the town his middle name.

Remsen was platted by the Iowa Falls and Sioux City Railroad Town Land and Lot Company August 28, 1876, and was incorporated in the spring of 1889. The population in 1885 was given at 650, of whom 400 were American born.

Remsen was settled by mostly German and Luxembourg immigrants. Plagued by religious persecution, unwelcome Prussian military conscription and economic limitations, the early immigrants left their native land to start a new life in the land of opportunity now called Remsen.

Remsen citizens retained their Luxembourg traditions of deep religious faith and loyal, energetic, hard working and fun loving style. At the same time they contributed to their share in the building and development of America and were quick to respond whenever Uncle Sam called on his citizens for a service, always eager to do something for the land which gave them the opportunity to raise their families as free and independent American citizens.

During Prohibition, Remsen was a major player in the brewing, transporting and sale of illegal alcohol. Its location adjacent to larger midwestern cities and the amount of farmland between homes made it a perfect area to make moonshine. Much of the moonshine produced ended up in one of two other Iowa cities: Sioux City or Pocahontas.

On July 4, 1936, a massive fire destroyed 15 homes and 18 buildings that housed 38 businesses. The fire started when a couple young kids, never identified, were playing with fireworks when a nearby tent caught fire. With the winds and extreme heat, the fire was out of control within minutes. Resulting in an all night battle for nearby fire departments. This led to the 84 year long ban of fireworks in Iowa.

Geography
Remsen is located at  (42.813118, -95.971673).

Demographics

2010 census
As of the census of 2010, there were 1,663 people, 645 households, and 436 families living in the city. The racial makeup of the city was 98.2% White, 0.1% African American, 0.5% Native American, 0.2% Asian, 0.5% from other races, and 0.5% from two or more races. Hispanic or Latino of any race were 1.9% of the population.

There were 645 households, of which 32.1% had children under the age of 18 living with them, 55.8% were married couples living together, 8.2% had a female householder with no husband present, 3.6% had a male householder with no wife present, and 32.4% were non-families. 29.6% of all households were made up of individuals, and 15.5% had someone living alone who was 65 years of age or older. The average household size was 2.50 and the average family size was 3.11.

The median age in the city was 41.4 years. 27.8% of residents were under the age of 18; 5.3% were between the ages of 18 and 24; 21.8% were from 25 to 44; 24.7% were from 45 to 64; and 20.4% were 65 years of age or older. The gender makeup of the city was 47.4% male and 52.6% female.

2000 census
As of the census of 2000, there were 1,762 people, 671 households, and 460 families living in the city. The racial makeup of the city was 99.49% White, 0.06% Asian, 0.11% from other races, and 0.34% from two or more races. Hispanic or Latino of any race were 0.34% of the population.

There were 671 households, out of which 34.0% had children under the age of 18 living with them, 59.3% were married couples living together, 6.0% had a female householder with no husband present, and 31.4% were non-families. 28.3% of all households were made up of individuals, and 17.9% had someone living alone who was 65 years of age or older. The average household size was 2.53 and the average family size was 3.15.

28.9% were under the age of 18, 5.2% from 18 to 24, 24.3% from 25 to 44, 17.6% from 45 to 64, and 24.0% were 65 years of age or older. The median age was 39 years. For every 100 females, there were 93.0 males. For every 100 females age 18 and over, there were 86.5 males.

The median household income was $37,950 and the median family income was $48,250. Males had a median income of $32,841 versus $21,094 for females. The per capita income for the city was $17,465. About 3.3% of families and 5.7% of the population were below the poverty line, including 6.3% of those under age 18 and 6.3% of those age 65 or over.

Education
It is within the Remsen Union Community School District. The MMC district currently operates as "MMCRU" schools as part of a grade-sharing arrangement with the Marcus-Meriden-Cleghorn Community School District.

It also houses Remsen St. Mary's, a private, Roman Catholic school.

References

External links
 City website
 A short memorial book put together by the citizens of Remsen after World War II

Cities in Plymouth County, Iowa
Cities in Iowa
Populated places established in 1889
1889 establishments in Iowa